Agrestina (Wilding) is a Brazilian municipality in the state of Pernambuco, mesoregion of Agreste.

Geography

 State - Pernambuco
 Region - Agreste of Pernambuco
 Boundaries - Caruaru and Bezerros  (N); Cupira  (S); São Joaquim do Monte  (E); Altinho  (W)
 Area - 
 Elevation - 
 Hydrography - Una River
 Vegetation - Hiperxerófila caatinga
 Climate - Transition between tropical (coastal) and semi arid
 Annual average temperature - 23.4 c
 Distance to Recife -

Economy

The main economic activities in Agrestina are based in general commerce, industry  and agribusiness. Especially, manioc and, creations of cattle, goats and sheep.

Economic Indicators

Economy by Sector
2006

Health Indicators

History

Agrestina was founded in 1884 so Bebedouro, and became a district of Altinho in 1911. It became an independent municipality in 1928 under the name of Bebedouro, which was changed to Agrestina in 1943.

References

Municipalities in Pernambuco